The men's 60 kg weightlifting competitions at the 1964 Summer Olympics in Tokyo took place on 12 October at the Shibuya Public Hall. It was the tenth appearance of the featherweight class.

Results

References

Weightlifting at the 1964 Summer Olympics